Tanguélan (also spelled Tenguélan) is a town in eastern Ivory Coast. It is a sub-prefecture of Agnibilékrou Department in Indénié-Djuablin Region, Comoé District.

Tanguélan was a commune until March 2012, when it became one of 1126 communes nationwide that were abolished.
In 2014, the population of the sub-prefecture of Tanguélan was 12,021.

Villages
The eight villages of the sub-prefecture of Tanguélan and their population in 2014 are:
 Tanguelan  (7 022)
 Adanekro  (394)
 Assemiankro  (168)
 Assempa Naye  (222)
 Ebakro  (186)
 Kouamekro  (207)
 Miankouadiokro  (106)
 N'guessankro  (3 716)

References

Sub-prefectures of Indénié-Djuablin
Former communes of Ivory Coast